Kyle Bradstreet (born 1979/1980) is an American television writer and producer. From 2015 to 2019, Bradstreet worked on the USA Network series Mr. Robot. He is the creator and the executive producer of the upcoming Disney+ miniseries Secret Invasion.

Career 
While attending Buffalo State College, he met television writer Tom Fontana, and upon graduating Bradstreet moved to New York City to work for Fontana, writing for his shows The Philanthropist, Copper, and Borgia. He also worked on Berlin Station as a consulting producer.

Bradstreet wrote and executive produced on the USA Network series Mr. Robot from 2015 to 2019, and was nominated for the Primetime Emmy Award for Outstanding Drama Series in 2016.

In September 2020, Bradstreet was announced to be writing and showrunning a Nick Fury television series for the Marvel Cinematic Universe, eventually revealed to be Secret Invasion. He will write and executive produce Alice Isn't Dead, a television series based on the podcast of the same name. He will also serve as showrunner.

Personal life 
Bradstreet was raised in Palmyra, New York. His mother, Lauren, is a reading specialist at Palmyra-Macedon High School, which Bradstreet graduated from in 1998. He also attended Buffalo State College, initially planning to become an English teacher. He currently lives in New York City.

Filmography

Awards and nominations

References

External links
 

Living people
American television writers
People from Rochester, New York
Buffalo State College alumni
Year of birth missing (living people)